Qat'aa, a form of poetry, is a part of soazkhwani / mersiya-khwani. Qat'aa is also known as Ruba'ee and performed before marsiya-khwani. When Qat'aa, Ruba'ee, Soaz, Salaam and Marsiya are performed combined it is called soazkhwani / marsiya-khwani.

See also
Na`at

External links
  Babulim Students Society, Karachi, Pakistan
Sherosukhan-Salaam 

Islamic poetry